= Pasmamla =

Coordinates: 17°21′N 78°39′E

Pasumamula
- Village
- Interactive map of Pasumamula
- State: Telangana

Languages
  - Official: Telugu
- Time zone: UTC+5:30 (IST)
- Telephone code: 040
- Vehicle registration: TS 07 X XXXX

Pasumamula is a village in Rangareddy district in Telangana, India. It falls under Abdhullapurmet mandal.
